Chamaepsylla is a genus of true bugs belonging to the family Psyllidae.

The species of this genus are found in Europe and Northern America.

Species:
 Chamaepsylla hartigii (Flor, 1861)

References

Psyllidae